James Greenwood (25 August 1838 – 6 November 1882) was an English-born Australian politician.

He was born at Stansfield in Yorkshire to Richard and Betty Greenwood. He studied at the University of London, receiving a Master of Arts in theology, philosophy and economics in 1866. He became a Baptist pastor at Nottingham. On 26 June 1866 he married Mary Anne Wallis Ward; they had seven children, of whom four survived to adulthood. He migrated to Sydney in 1870 and became director of the Baptist Training College; a campaigner for secular education, he resigned from the ministry in 1876. In 1877 he was elected to the New South Wales Legislative Assembly for East Sydney, but he did not re-contest in 1880. Greenwood died at Paddington in 1882.

References

 

1838 births
1882 deaths
Members of the New South Wales Legislative Assembly
19th-century Australian politicians
English emigrants to colonial Australia